Liyanage Don Vasanthi Ratnayake (born 30 November 1973) is a Sri Lankan former cricketer who played primarily as a right-handed batter. She appeared in one Test match and 22 One Day Internationals for Sri Lanka between 1997 and 2003.

Ratnayake made her international debut in 1997, when she played in an ODI between Sri Lanka and the Netherlands, in Colombo. Opening the batting in that match, she scored just one run. She made her only Test match appearance in 1998, playing against Pakistan, scoring five and thirteen. She scored an international half-century for the first time in 2002, also against Pakistan, when she scored 88. This remained her highest score in international cricket. She scored two further half-centuries; 51 later in that same series against Pakistan, and 67 not out on her final appearance in international cricket, against the West Indies in 2003. In total, Ratnayake played 22 ODIs, scoring 558 runs at an average of 26.57. In her only Test appearance, she scored 18 runs at an average of 9.00. She bowled 90 balls in ODI cricket, but did not take a wicket.

References

External links
 
 

1973 births
Living people
Cricketers from Colombo
Sri Lankan women cricketers
Sri Lanka women Test cricketers
Sri Lanka women One Day International cricketers